Arthur Paul Massaro III (born June 24, 1991) is a senior policy advisor for the U.S. Helsinki Commission, also known as the Commission on Security and Cooperation in Europe, where his portfolio includes counter-corruption, human rights, sanctions, illicit finance and energy security. Massaro has been involved in creating various anti-corruption and human rights reforms and shepherding them through the legislative system.

Advocacy and reception 
During February 2023, Massaro deleted a Twitter photo of himself with a patch that contained the effigy of Ukrainian ultranationalist and World War II Nazi collaborator Stepan Bandera after a backlash.

The Belarusian state media, Belteleradio, criticized Massaro for calling on Washington's allies to not give Syria a cent after the 2023 Turkey–Syria earthquake. The state media called Massaro's comment "the most cynical refusal to help the Syrian people."

Early life and education 

Massaro was born June 24, 1991 in Maryland and grew up in Severna Park, Maryland, attending Severna Park High School. He completed undergraduate studies at the University of Maryland, College Park, where he earned bachelor's degrees in government & politics and Germanic studies.

He completed a master's degree in "public policy with a specialization in international security and economic policy" from the University of Maryland School of Public Policy, where he is pursuing a PhD.

References 

1991 births
Living people
Anti-corruption activists
People from Severna Park, Maryland
Reactions to the 2022 Russian invasion of Ukraine